Bordello Death Tales is a 2009 horror anthology film directed by James Eaves ("The Ripper"), Alan Ronald ("Stitchgirl") and Pat Higgins ("Vice Day").

Plot
"The Ripper" features a serial killer who targets strippers and eventually takes home the wrong girl from the title bordello.

"Stitchgirl" stars Eleanor James as the title character who is crafted from several girls to suit the whims of bordello patron Dr Whale. This segment was intended to be an homage to James Whale's Bride of Frankenstein.

"Vice Day" is the story of Daniel Cain who one day a year indulges his basest urges. On this day, Cain terrorizes a webcam model.

ReceptionAint It Cool News'' said the filmmakers "deliver original and unique chills and thrills." M. J. Simpson called the film "An ambitious and impressive recreation of the golden age of Amicus."

References

External links

2009 horror films
2009 films
2000s English-language films